The Herzogstand is a mountain in the Bavarian foothills of the Alps,  south of the city of Munich. Maximilian II of Bavaria had a hunting lodge built underneath today's so-called Herzogstand-house in 1857. His successor, King Ludwig II, had a royal lodge built further up the mountain in 1865.

The most popular ascent (AV way 446) leads from the valley station of the aerial tramway across the south side to Herzogstand-house and on to the summit of the mountain. An alternative descent leads along the somewhat exposed but well-secured ridge to the Heimgarten mountain, passing a lodge to the south of the Ohlstaedter Alm. The descent east of the Rotwandkopf continues down to the spa town of Walchensee (Kochel).

Transmitter
The summit of Herzogstand has been used since 1920 for radiotechnical purposes; a VLF transmission antenna was erected between 1920 and 1934. Today, an FM radio transmitter on Fahrenbergkopf broadcasts the following stations:

See also 
 Herzogstand Aerial Tramway
 Herzogstand Radio Station

Mountains of the Alps
Mountains of Bavaria
One-thousanders of Germany
Bavarian Prealps
Bad Tölz-Wolfratshausen